The 1896 Brown Bears football team represented Brown University as an independent in the 1896 college football season. Led by second-year head coach Wallace Moyle, Brown compiled a record of 4–5–1.

Schedule

References

Brown
Brown Bears football seasons
Brown Bears football